The Canton Commercial Historic District in Canton, Georgia is a  historic district which is roughly bounded by Main, Church, Archer, and Marietta Streets.  It was listed on the National Register of Historic Places in 1984 and included 10 contributing buildings.

It was deemed significant in architecture for its "collection of modest late-nineteenth- and early-twentieth-century commercial buildings that reflect the types and styles of buildings
built in the central business districts of Georgia's small towns. In terms of commerce, the district is significant for representing the intact portion of Canton's historic central business district."

It includes:
Bank of Canton (1892), Beaux Arts-style
Canton Theatre (1913, remodeled ca. 1940) Art Moderne-style.

The Cherokee County Courthouse, also National Register-listed, is about a block away from the district.

See also
Canton Historic District (Canton, Georgia)

References

Historic districts in Georgia (U.S. state)
National Register of Historic Places in Cherokee County, Georgia
Victorian architecture in Georgia (U.S. state)